The traditional Chinese calendar divides a year into 24 solar terms. Dōngzhì, Tōji, Dongji, Tunji (in Okinawan), or Đông chí (in Vietnamese) is the 22nd solar term, and marks the winter solstice. It begins when the Sun reaches the celestial longitude of 270° and ends when it reaches the longitude of 285°. It more often refers in particular to the day when the Sun is exactly at the celestial longitude of 270°. In the Gregorian calendar, it usually begins around 21 December (22 December East Asia time) and ends around 5 January.

Along with equinoxes, solstices mark the middle of Traditional Chinese calendar seasons. Thus, in "", the Chinese character "至" means "extreme", which implies "solstices", and therefore the term for the winter solstice directly signifies the summit of winter, as "midwinter" is used in English.

Culture

China 

In China, Dongzhi was originally celebrated as an end-of-harvest festival. Today, it is observed with a family reunion over the long night, when pink and white tangyuan are eaten in southern China in sweet broth to symbolise family unity and prosperity. Whereas in Northern China, the traditional Dongzhi food would be the jiaozi.

Korea 
In Korea, the winter solstice is also called the "Small Seol," and there is a custom of celebrating the day. People make porridge with red beans known as patjuk and round rice cakes with sticky rice. In the past, red bean porridge soup was sprayed on walls or doors because it was said to ward off bad ghosts. In addition, there was a custom in the early days of the Goryeo and Joseon Period in which people in financial difficulty settled all their debts and enjoyed the day.

Japan 
In Japan, Tōji is also one of the 24 solar terms. On this day, it is customary to drink grapefruit hot water and eat pumpkin in certain places. The とうじ‐カボチャ【冬至カボチャ】.The habit of eating pumpkin during the winter solstice is because it makes sense to provide products for the festival during the winter when vegetables are lacking. とうじ‐ばい【冬至梅】is a variety of plum. White flowers begin to bloom around the winter solstice. とうじ It is still a surname in Japan and has a long history.

Pentads 
蚯蚓結, 'Earthworms form knots', referring to the hibernation of earthworms.
麋角解, 'Deer shed their antlers'
水泉動, 'Spring water moves'

Date and time

See also 
Dongzhi Festival
Winter solstice

References 

22
Winter time

ja:冬至